The 2009 end of year rugby internationals, also known as the Autumn internationals in the Northern Hemisphere, saw Australia, New Zealand, South Africa, and Argentina, tour the northern hemisphere.

The headline event of the series was an attempted Grand Slam tour of the Home Nations by Australia. This year marked the 25th anniversary of the Wallabies' only previous Grand Slam tour, which saw the Wallabies sweep all four matches and saw David Campese, Mark Ella, Nick Farr-Jones, and Michael Lynagh achieve international prominence. Also, for the second consecutive year, a Bledisloe Cup match was contested by New Zealand and Australia outside of either country, this time in Tokyo. The final event of the series, the Barbarians' traditional Final Challenge, involved New Zealand, with the Barbarians winning over a mostly second-string All Blacks side.

For the first time since the inception of the IRB World Rankings in 2003, all of the top 20 teams in the rankings played matches in the November window. The only top-20 teams not playing in the November tours were Uruguay and the United States, which played a two-legged 2011 Rugby World Cup qualifying tie during November.

This year's series was also marked by more non-Test matches pitting Test teams with top-level club teams than in recent years. Matches of this type are often called "midweek matches" because they are traditionally played at midweek, most often on Wednesday, although they can also be scheduled on a weekend when the touring team has no Test scheduled. Australia and South Africa both scheduled two such matches; the Wallabies won both of their matches comfortably, while the Springboks lost both of theirs.

Matches

Week 1

Week 2

Week 3

 Ras Dumisani's controversial rendition of the South African national anthem before the game caused a minor diplomatic incident afterwards.

 Japan's victory saw them achieve their highest ever spot on the IRB World Rankings.

 Ireland captain Brian O'Driscoll became the 11th player to reach 100 Test caps.

Week 4

 Dan Carter became the all-time leading Test point scorer for the All Blacks, surpassing Andrew Mehrtens.

Week 5

 This was Italy's first win since June 2008, ending a 13-game losing streak.

Week 6

 This was New Zealand's first loss in the Northern Hemisphere since 2007, as well as the first time in two years a team had managed to score tries against them in the Northern Hemisphere.

See also
 Autumn rugby union internationals

Notes and references

2009
2009–10 in European rugby union
2009 in Oceanian rugby union
2009 in North American rugby union
2009 in South American rugby union
2009 in African rugby union